The PBA Regional Tour is a series of "mini tours", run by the Professional Bowlers Association, spanning across seven regions within the United States. The Tour allows PBA members and qualifying non-member amateurs to compete in weekend events. The Tour consists of seven regions: Central, East, Midwest, Northwest, South, Southwest, and West.

Regional Qualifying for the PBA Tour

The majority of the PBA's 3,000+ members are Regional professionals. In a typical season, fewer than 100 players regularly compete on the national PBA Tour.

Through the 2008–09 season, Regional PBA professionals could qualify for the national tour by topping one of the seven regions in points. For the 2009–10 season, Regional qualification was revised, as bowlers had to qualify via the Regional Players Invitational (RPI) tournament. The top 25 bowlers on the RPI points list in each of the seven PBA regions (through September, 2008) earned an invitation to the 2008 RPI. The top five from each region – plus the winner of the 2008 Regional Players Championship (won by Sean Swanson in late May that year) – received airfare and accommodations for the event in December, 2008 and did not have to pay an additional fee to be eligible for a PBA Tour exemption. The next 20 players in each region were required to pay their own way to the RPI, and also had to pay an additional $750 on top of the entry fee to be eligible for a Tour exemption.

The 2008 RPI featured a similar format to the PBA Tour Trials, in that competitors bowled for five days on each of the PBA's five "animal" oil patterns.  The top eight bowlers who (if necessary) paid the additional entry fee earned exemptions for the 2009–10 season, provided they finished in the top 16 overall.

The exempt PBA Tour format was discontinued prior to the 2012–13 season, which meant the end of the RPI.

Current Regional Tour

The PBA continues to run a Regional Tour to the present day. Regional Tour events are open to both PBA members and non-members, with most events requiring a higher entry fee for non-members. Any player who wins two Regional Tour events in a season as a non-member must become a PBA member to enter any subsequent events during that season.

References and footnotes

External links
Professional Bowlers Association (PBA) homepage
PBA Regional Tour homepage
PBA on ESPN

 
Ten-pin bowling competitions in the United States